The 12547 / 12548 Agra Cantt–Sabarmati Superfast Express is a superfast train belonging to North Central Railway zone of Indian Railways that run between  and  in India.

Later it was extended up to on a daily basis

Terminal of 12547/12548 Ahmedabad–Agra Fort Superfast Express was changed to Agra Cantonment instead of Agra Fort. Now, 12547/12548 Ahmedabad–Agra Cantt Superfast Express operates four days a week from Sabarmati BG (SBIB).

Coach composition

The train has standard LHB rakes with max speed of 110 kmph. The train consists of 21 coaches:
 
 1 AC II Tier
 3 AC III Tier
 9 Sleeper coaches
 6 General Unreserved
 2 End-on Generator

Service

This train covers the distance of 865 km with an average speed of 56 km/h with total time of 15 hours 30 mins.

As the average speed of the train is above 55 km/hr, as per Indian Railways rules, its fare includes a Superfast surcharge.

Route & Halts

The important halts of the train are:

Schedule

Rake sharing

The train shares its rake with 22547/22548 Gwalior–Ahmedabad Superfast Express.

Traction

As this route is going to be electrified, a Bhagat Ki Kothi-based WDP-4 / WDP-4B / WDP-4D or Abu Road-based WDP-4D locomotive pulls the train to the destination on both directions.

External links
 12547/Agra Cantt.–Ahmedabad SF Express
 12548/Ahmedabad–Agra Cantt. SF Express

References

Trains from Agra
Transport in Ahmedabad
Rail transport in Rajasthan
Rail transport in Gujarat
Railway services introduced in 2011
Express trains in India